The Isthmus of Catanzaro (or Isthmus of Marcellinara, also called Saddle of Catanzaro or Saddle of Marcellinara due to its morphology) is a narrow strip of land separating the Ionian Sea from the Tyrrhenian Sea, in Calabria. It is the narrowest section of the Italian Peninsula.

Description 
The Isthmus is approximately 30 kilometres long and is situated in the lowlands between the south end of the Sila mountainous plateau and the northern part of the Calabrian Serre. The valley between the two mountain ranges is approximately 2 kilometres wide in its narrowest point, and it opens wide to form the Piana di Sant'Eufemia on the west side, and the valley of Corace to the east, reaching the seas at both sides. South of Marcellinara is the Sella di Marcellinara (Saddle of Marcellinara), the lowest and narrowest point of the Calabrian Apennine, at a height of about 250 metres.
From the high grounds of the Calabrian Apennine, in the towns of Tiriolo, Marcellinara and Catanzaro, it is possible to have a panoramic view of the Ionian and Tyrrhenian Seas at the same time. The isthmus is crossed by two seasonal rivers: the Amato and the Corace. Both have their springs from the Plateau of Sila and, after running parallel, separated by about two kilometres, they separate near the hills of Gimigliano. The Amato descends the valley westwards, ending its run in Tyrrhenian Sea, whereas the Corace goes eastwards to the Ionian Sea.

History
According to classical accounts, during the slave rebellion led by Spartacus, general Marcus Licinius Crassus decided to fortify the Isthmus by mean of a wall, in order to block their offensive and cut supplies.

During the Fascist era of the early 20th century, the construction of a channel to connect the Ionian to the Tyrrhenian has been advanced several times.

Mythology
Not everyone knows that Italy got its name precisely from this area derived from the word Italòi. The term was used by the Greeks to designate the Vituli, i.e. the Itali, a population that inhabited these lands and worshipped the image of a calf. The name, therefore, means “the inhabitants of the land of calves” and, until the beginning of the 5th century B.C., indicated only the current Calabria, then gradually started to identify the whole southern part of the country. 

From 49 B.C., the term “Italy” began to indicate the entire peninsula, since the emperor Augustus expanded the borders to the east including Istria and west up to the Var river (in the current area of Nice).

It is the historian Antiochus who tells about these events:
“The entire land between the two gulfs of seas, the Nepetinico (Lamezia Terme) and the Scilletinico (Squillace), was reduced under the power of a good and wise man, who convinced his neighbours, some with words, others with force. This man was called Italo and he was the first one who called this land Italy. And when Italo took possession of this land of the isthmus [of Catanzaro], and had many people who were submitted to it. He immediately claimed the neighbouring territories and placed many cities under his domination.”

The story of King Italo, dating back to the late Iron Age, is presented with such peremptoriness that can be freed from the dimension of myth and legend, to be handed over to history. In his book History of the Peloponnesian War, Thucydides writes in fact that:
“Then there are still some Siculi in Italy, [a country] which drew this name from someone called Italo, king of the Arcadians.”

Province of Catanzaro
Catanzaro